Football Stadium Myjava is a football stadium in Myjava, Slovakia. It serves as home stadium for football club Spartak Myjava. The stadium has a capacity of 2,709 (all seats). The intensity of the floodlighting is 1,100 lux. The stadium was renovated in 2012–13.

External links 
Stadium website 
Football stadiums 
Stadium database article

References

Football venues in Slovakia
Buildings and structures in Trenčín Region
Sport in Trenčín Region
Sports venues completed in 1954